This is a list of seasons completed by the Virginia Tech Hokies men's college basketball team.

Seasons

References

 
Virginia Tech Hokies
Virginia Tech Hokies basketball seasons